The results of the 2022 Little League World Series were determined between August 17 and August 28, 2022 in South Williamsport, Pennsylvania. Twenty teams were divided into two groups, one with ten teams from the United States and another with ten international teams, with both groups playing a modified double-elimination tournament. In each group, the last remaining undefeated team faced the last remaining team with one loss, with the winners of those games advancing to play for the Little League World Series championship. Hawaii, the United States champions, defeated Curaçao, the international champions, 13-3 to win the 2022 championship, their second title in four years.

Double-elimination stage

United States

Winner's bracket

Game 2: Tennessee 5, Massachusetts 3

Game 4: Hawaii 11, Washington 1

Game 6: Indiana 8, Iowa 7

Game 8: Texas 8, Pennsylvania 3

Game 10: Tennessee 11, Utah 2

Game 12: Hawaii 12, New York 0

Game 22: Tennessee 5, Indiana 2

Game 24: Hawaii 6, Texas 0

Game 30: Hawaii 13, Tennessee 0

Loser's bracket

Game 14: Iowa 6, Washington 3

Game 16: Pennsylvania 7, Massachusetts 5

Game 18: Iowa 10, Utah 2

Game 20: Pennsylvania 7, New York 1

Game 26: Pennsylvania 10, Indiana 0

Game 28: Texas 4, Iowa 0

Game 32: Texas 8, Pennsylvania 4

Game 34: Tennessee 7, Texas 1

International

Winner's bracket

Game 1: Curaçao 2, Nicaragua 0

Game 3: Canada 7, Australia 0

Game 5: Taiwan 2, Italy 0

Game 7: Mexico 6, Puerto Rico 1

Game 9: Panama 9, Curaçao 3

Game 11: Canada 6, Japan 0

Game 21: Taiwan 7, Panama 0

Game 23: Mexico 10, Canada 0

Game 29: Taiwan 5, Mexico 1

Loser's bracket

Game 13: Italy 12, Australia 7

Game 15: Nicaragua 3, Puerto Rico 1

Game 17: Curaçao 1, Italy 0

Game 19: Nicaragua 8, Japan 7

Game 25: Nicaragua 8, Panama 1

Game 27: Curaçao 4, Canada 2

Game 31: Curaçao 7, Nicaragua 2

Game 33: Curaçao 2, Mexico 1

Single-elimination stage

International championship: Curaçao 1, Taiwan 0

United States championship: Hawaii 5, Tennessee 1

Third place game: Taiwan 2, Tennessee 0

World championship game: Hawaii 13, Curaçao 3

References

External links
2022 LLBWS bracket from littleleague.org

2022 Little League World Series